The South African Railways Class 12B 4-8-2 of 1920 was a steam locomotive.

In 1920, the South African Railways placed thirty Class 12B steam locomotives with a 4-8-2 Mountain type wheel arrangement in service.

Manufacturer
In May 1920, an additional thirty locomotives, built to the Class 12 design of SAR Chief Mechanical Engineer (CME) D.A. Hendrie, were delivered to the South African Railways (SAR) from Baldwin Locomotive Works in the United States of America. Most of them were erected in the SAR workshops, but a few were contracted to James Brown and Company at Durban for erection. Even though they were very similar to the second and subsequent orders of the Class 12 which was also designed specifically for the Midland System, they were classified separately as Class 12B and numbered in the range from 1931 to 1960. Like the Class 12, they were also built with plate frames, Walschaerts valve gear and Belpaire fireboxes.

Classification

The separate 12B classification has been ascribed to the fact that the wheelbase of the leading bogie was  longer than on the original Class 12 locomotives. This was probably not the reason, bearing in mind that only the first eight out of altogether 46 Class 12 locomotives were built with leading bogies with a  wheelbase, while the other thirty-eight all had leading bogies with a  wheelbase, the same as the Class 12B. More likely, the separate classification was simply based on the fact that the Class 12 was British-built while the Class 12B was American-built.

Watson Standard boilers
During the 1930s, many serving locomotives were reboilered with a standard boiler type designed by then CME A.G. Watson as part of his standardisation policy. Such Watson Standard reboilered locomotives were reclassified by adding an "R" suffix to their classification.

All thirty Class 12B locomotives were eventually reboilered with Watson Standard no. 2 boilers. In the process, they were also equipped with Watson cabs with their distinctive slanted fronts, compared to the conventional vertical fronts of their original cabs. Upon reboilering, the unknown original reason for the separate classification was ignored and instead of becoming Class 12BR, the reboilered locomotives were reclassified to Class 12R along with the reboilered Class 12 locomotives.

Their original Belpaire saturated steam boilers were fitted with Ramsbottom safety valves, while the Watson Standard superheated steam boiler was fitted with Pop safety valves.

Service

South African Railways
All thirty locomotives were placed in service on the Cape Midland to work on the mainline out of Port Elizabeth, where they largely remained until being withdrawn after more than sixty years in service. Even though they were not designed to be mixed traffic locomotives, they saw service on both passenger and goods working. Until the Class 15F arrived on the Midland, the mainline was ruled by these locomotives. Later, in spite of their small  diameter coupled wheels, they were comfortable at  when employed on the mainline in tandem with the larger Class 15F.

The Class 12Rs saw mainline work until well into 1969, when the arrival of new Class  diesel-electrics brought almost fifty years of mainline service to an end. The entire Class gave more than fifty years of service before the first one was withdrawn.

Even in their twilight years, these locomotives still saw mainline service on the Klipplaat run and as local goods haulers around Port Elizabeth.

Industrial
For some reason, few Class 12Rs ended up in industrial service despite their evident suitability for such work. Of the ex Class 12B locomotives, only no. 1936 was sold to Enyati Colliery and later became Western Holdings Gold Mine's no. 8.

Works numbers
The Baldwin works numbers did not run consecutively for the whole order and are shown in the table.

Preservation

Illustration

References

1720
1720
1720
4-8-2 locomotives
2D1 locomotives
Baldwin locomotives
Cape gauge railway locomotives
Railway locomotives introduced in 1920
1920 in South Africa
Scrapped locomotives